The UP Manila Chorale is the multi-awarded official performing group for choral music of the University of the Philippines Manila. Established in July 1992 by a few BA Behavioral Sciences students, the group aims to embody and represent the University locally and internationally through the art of choral music, serving as ambassadors of cultural goodwill by being the “voice of UP Manila to the world”. Presently, the group is led by their musical director, Emmanuel "Eman" P. de Leon Jr.

Through the years, the group has been performing a wide repertoire: sacred, secular, spiritual, folk, jazz, pop and our very own Filipino music. The UPMC has been able to mold its members coming from non-musical disciplines into well-rounded and versatile singers. In the recent years the UPMC has performed major works and various compositions by Franz Biebl, Morten Lauridsen, Moses Hogan, Z. Randall Stroope, C. V. Stanford, Edward Elgar, Karol Szymanowski, and many more. As an advocate of Filipino choral music, the UPMC has in their repertoire the music of Eudenice "Eudy" Palaruan, Nilo Alcala, John August Pamintuan, and Josefino "Chino" Toledo

The UPMC has an established record of successful concerts and projects; these include major concerts, benefit concerts, local and international choral competitions, local and international choral festivals, nine international concert tours, and performances for heads of state and dignitaries. The group is regularly invited to choral competitions, and it has garnered several awards locally and internationally. As of August 2016, the UP Manila Chorale ranks number 44 in the Musica Mundi/ INTERKULTUR World Ranking List - Top 50 Mixed Choirs and number 31 in the Musica Mundi/ INTERKULTUR World Ranking List - Top 50 Pop/ Jazz/ Gospel/ Spiritual/ Barbershop Choirs. Meanwhile, the group ranks number 202 in the Musica Mundi/ INTERKULTUR World Ranking List – Top 1000 Choirs.
 
In June 2015, the UPMC travelled and performed in nine European countries and was awarded in two of the most prestigious and longest running choral competitions in Spain. The group was declared 3rd prize winner in the mixed category and second prize winner in the folk category in the 33° Festival Internacional de Musica de Cantonigros in Vic, Spain, and 1st prize winner in the polyphony category of the 61° Certamen Internacional de Habaneras y Polifonia in Torrevieja, Spain. This year, the UPMC partnered with Habitat for Humanity Philippines as their beneficiary in their goal of rebuilding homes affected by the 2013 Bohol earthquake.

In February 2016, the group  was awarded the Ani ng Dangal (Harvest of Honors) given by the National Commission for Culture and the Arts in recognition of their achievements from the aforementioned choral competitions during their 8th European Tour.

Conductor 
Eman earned his Diploma for Creative and Performing Musical Arts (DCPMA) and Bachelor of Music (BM) degree, major in Music Education, from the University of the Philippines College of Music. As a musician, he has established himself as a chorister, conductor, arranger, and teacher, lending his talents by playing these roles to different choirs, organizations, and events. He has composed and arranged pieces for various choral competitions, orchestral performances, television, and stage productions.

Prior to UPMC, Eman served as the former Assistant Conductor of the University of the Philippines Concert Chorus from 2007-2012. In 2012, he conducted and led the group in winning several international recognitions in different competitions in Europe.

Currently, Eman holds a master's degree in Music (MM), major in Choral Conducting, also hailing from the UP College of Music. He is a faculty of the Conducting Department in the UP College of Music Extension Program. He also sings Bass-Baritone with the Philippine Madrigal Singers.

Awards and competitions

External links 
 UPMC's Official Website
 UPMC's Official facebook page
 UPMC's Official twitter page
 UPMC's Official Youtube page

References 

University of the Philippines
Musical groups from Metro Manila
Musical groups established in 1992